Kapolcs is a village in Veszprém county, Hungary.

Location

The villages lies in Káli-medence landscape area, in the valley of Eger-patak ( the citizens of Kapolcs call it "Séd").

Neighbouring villages

 Vigántpetend, Monostorapáti and Taliándörögd.

External links 

 Street map (Hungarian)
 Unofficial Website of Kapolcs (Hungarian)

Populated places in Veszprém County